Claus Wisser (born 30 June 1942) is a German entrepreneur and a patron of music and the arts. He was head of the service company Wisag which he founded, and has been chairman of its supervisory board since 2011. He is also known for being a founding member of the Rheingau Musik Festival, and chairman of its supporting association. He was twice a member of the Federal Convention to elect the German President.

Career 
Wisser was born in Wiesbaden, the son of a shopkeeper. When he was 14, his father had to close the shop, and the boy took several jobs during his time at the gymnasium. While still at school, he joined the SPD. He studied business administration at the University of Frankfurt, and took part in the beginning Studentenrevolte, opposing the German Emergency Acts. He heard Carlo Schmid in public lectures at the university.

In 1965, Wisser founded a company for the cleaning of office buildings, dropping out of the university. He describes the services as for industry, administration, airlines, and airports, especially the traffic on the ground for the latter. In 2011, he passed on his position as chairman of the board to his son Michael Wisser, and has been chairman of the supervisory board since.

In 1987, he was one of the founding members of the Rheingau Musik Festival, together with Michael Herrmann, Tatiana von Metternich-Winneburg, Michael Bolenius, Hans-Clemens Lucht, and Ulrich Rosin. He succeeded Walter Fink as chairman of the Rheingau Musik Festival Förderverein, an association to support the festival. Honoring his 60th birthday on 30 June 2002, the festival staged a performance of Carl Orff's  at Eberbach Abbey, with soloists Annette Dasch, Gert Henning-Jensen, and Željko Lučić, the choir Orfeón Donostiarra, and the hr-Sinfonieorchester conducted by Hugh Wolff, which was recorded. Wisser has also sponsored the Städel museum and the Caricatura Museum Frankfurt, and the University of Frankfurt. He began a project to transform the former Johannisberg Abbey into a hotel and event location.

Wisser was a member of the Federal Convention for the election of the German Bundespräsident, in 1999 and in 2017.

Awards 
 2005: 
 2013: 
 2015: ULI Leadership Award

References

External links 
 WISAG
 Claus Wisser: Alle Nachrichten und Informationen der F.A.Z. zum Thema FAZ
 Katja Gußmann: Folge 67: Firmengründer Claus Wisser Der rote Faden: So isser, der Wisser Frankfurter Neue Presse, 12 April 2014
 Thorsten Müller: Mit Inspiration und Transpiration zu Nachhaltigkeit und Effizienz Handel und Immobilien, 7 October 2016

1942 births
Living people
20th-century German businesspeople
21st-century German businesspeople
Businesspeople from Frankfurt
German patrons of music
German social democrats
German company founders